The Docklands Light Railway (DLR) is an automated light metro system serving the redeveloped Docklands area of London, England and provides a direct connection between London's two major financial districts, Canary Wharf and the City of London. Further extensions are being considered.

Normal operations are automated, so there is minimal staffing on the 149 trains (which have no driving cabs) and at major interchange stations; the four below-ground stations are staffed, to comply with underground station health and safety regulations.

The DLR is operated by franchisee KeolisAmey Docklands for Transport for London (TfL). Passenger numbers have increased as the network has expanded since its launch. In the financial year 2019/20 there were 116.8million passenger journeys.

History

Origins and development

The docks immediately east of Central London began to decline in the early 1960s as cargo became containerised. They had been connected to the national railway network via the London and Blackwall Railway (L&BR), which was closed in 1966 for lack of traffic. The opening of the Tilbury container docks, further east in Essex, finally rendered them redundant, and in 1980 the government gained control of the now-derelict area.

As early as 1972, consideration was given to how to redevelop the moribund Docklands. Travis Morgan & Partners were commissioned by the London Docklands Study Team to consider the issue. They proposed, among other recommendations, that a "minitram" people-mover system capable of carrying up to 20 people in each unit should be constructed to connect the Docklands with the planned Fleet line tube railway terminus at Fenchurch Street railway station. The Greater London Council formed a Docklands Joint Committee with the Boroughs of Greenwich, Lewisham, Newham, Southwark and Tower Hamlets in 1974 to undertake the redevelopment of the area. A light railway system was envisaged, terminating either at Tower Hill tube station or at nearby Fenchurch Street, but both options were seen as too expensive. Nonetheless, in 1976 another report proposed a conventional tube railway for the area and London Transport obtained Parliamentary powers to build a line from Charing Cross station to Fenchurch Street, Surrey Docks (now Surrey Quays railway station), the Isle of Dogs, North Greenwich and Custom House to Woolwich Arsenal. However, when the Thatcher Government came to power, the plans to extend the Jubilee line were halted and the new government insisted that a lower-cost option should be pursued.

The government established the London Docklands Development Corporation (LDDC) in July 1981 to coordinate the redevelopment of the Docklands. The need to provide a cheap public transport solution led to it commissioning London Transport to evaluate a number of exclusively light rail options. The core of the route ran alongside the Great Eastern line out of London and south along the former London & Blackwall Railway line through the Isle of Dogs. Three terminus options were proposed at the west end, at Tower Hill, Minories and Aldgate East. The Tower Hill option would have required a low-level interchange to be constructed alongside the existing Underground station, but this would have been a very costly venture. The Minories option, a high-level station virtually on the site of the old Minories railway station, was selected and became the current Tower Gateway DLR terminus. Aldgate East would have been perhaps the most ambitious of all of the options, as it originally envisaged a low-level connection with the District line that would have allowed DLR trains to run on London Underground tracks to a variety of central London destinations. However, it quickly became apparent that there was no capacity on the existing network for integrating the DLR into the Underground.

Two southern terminus options were put forward, at Cubitt Town (today's Island Gardens station) and Tiller Road, on the west side of Millwall Dock, with two possible routes to reach them. A "western" route would have run from the Westferry station alongside West Ferry Road via Cuba Street, then either terminating at Tiller Road or continuing over Millwall Docks Cut to a terminus at Cubitt Town. The "central" option required the West India Docks to be infilled or bridged and would run down the middle of the peninsula, through what was at the time an area of derelict warehouses. Ultimately this latter option was chosen, though the 1981 London Transport report warned that without extensive development around Canary Wharf the area would be "very isolated with poor traffic prospects" – as indeed it was, for a number of years.

The contract for the initial system was awarded to a GEC / John Mowlem joint venture in 1984 and the system was constructed from 1985 to 1987 at a cost of £77 million. The line was formally opened by Queen Elizabeth II on 30 July 1987, and passenger services began on 31 August.

Initial system (1987–1990)

It was mainly elevated on disused railway viaducts or new concrete viaducts, and adopted disused surface railway formations between Poplar and Stratford. The trains were fully automated, controlled by computer, and had no driver; a Passenger Service Agent (PSA) on each train, originally referred to as a "Train Captain", was responsible for patrolling the train, checking tickets, making announcements and controlling the doors. PSAs could take control of the train in circumstances including equipment failure and emergencies. A total of eleven units supplied by Linke-Hofmann-Busch comprised the first generation of the Docklands Light Railway rolling stock.

The system was lightweight, with stations designed for trains of only a single articulated vehicle. The three branches totalled , had 15 stations, and were connected by a flat triangular junction near . Services ran from Tower Gateway to Island Gardens and from Stratford to Island Gardens; the north side of the junction was used only for access to the Poplar depot. The stations were mostly of a common design and constructed from standard components. A common feature was a short half-cylindrical glazed blue canopy. All stations were above ground and were generally unstaffed.

Extensions to the City and the Royal Docks (1991–1994)

The initial system had a relatively low capacity, but the Docklands area very quickly developed into a major financial centre and employment zone, increasing traffic. In particular Tower Gateway, at the edge of the City of London, attracted criticism for its poor connections, as it did not connect directly with the nearby Tower Hill tube station or Fenchurch Street railway station. The criticism arose partly because the system usage was higher than expected. Stations and trains were extended to two-unit length, and the system was expanded into the heart of the City of London to  through a tunnel, which opened in 1991 at a cost of £295m. This extension left  on a stub.

The original trains were not suitable for underground usage due to not meeting the fire safety laws for underground trains. They were operated for a time on the above-ground sections only, and were later sold.

As the Canary Wharf office complex grew, Canary Wharf DLR station was redeveloped from a small wayside station to a large one with six platforms serving three tracks and a large overall roof, fully integrated into the malls below the office towers.

The east of Docklands needed better transport connections to encourage development, and a fourth branch, towards Beckton, was planned, with several route options available. A route from  via  and the north side of the Royal Docks complex was chosen, and opened in March 1994 at a cost of £280m. Initially it was thought the line was likely to be underutilised, due to the sparse development in the area and for this reason two additional stations at Thames Wharf (not to be confused with the later Thames Wharf proposal on the Woolwich branch) and Connaught were omitted. As part of this extension, one side of the original flat triangular junction was replaced by a grade-separated junction west of Poplar. Poplar was rebuilt to give cross-platform interchange between the Stratford and Beckton lines, with a new grade-separated junction built east of the station at the divergence of the Stratford and Beckton lines. As part of the extension, a new, larger, depot was built at Beckton.

Extension to Greenwich & Lewisham (1996–1999)
Early on, Lewisham London Borough Council commissioned a feasibility study into extending the system under the River Thames. This led the council to advocate an extension via Greenwich and Deptford, terminating at Lewisham railway station. The ambitions of the operators were supported by politicians in Parliament, including the future Labour Deputy Prime Minister John Prescott, and Lord Whitty; and by 1996 construction work had begun.

The Lewisham extension opened on 20 November 1999, at a cost of £200m funded mostly by the private sector as a Private finance initiative. The extension quickly proved profitable.

Extensions to London City Airport & Woolwich (2004–2009)

An extension to London City Airport from the existing Beckton branch was explored in the mid-90s, at first via travelator from Royal Albert, and then in 1998 via a proposed lift-bridge over the dock with an intermediate station at West Silvertown. The government initially supported this proposal, and in 1999 was developed to the route known today with a further extension to King George V. At this time, the further route to Woolwich Arsenal was developed with an intermediate station at Woolwich Reach, but was viewed as a longer term aspiration. The Woolwich Reach station (on the south bank of the Thames, at the site of the Marlborough Road ventilation and escape shaft), was descoped in 2000.

The extension was aided by a five-year programme of investment for public transport across London that was unveiled by Mayor of London Ken Livingstone on 12 October 2004. On 2 December 2005, an eastward branch along the approximate route of the former Eastern Counties and Thames Junction Railway on the southern side of the Royal Docks complex opened from Canning Town to  via .

Construction began in June 2005, the same month that the contracts were finalised, and the tunnels were completed on 23 July 2007, and formally opened by Boris Johnson, Mayor of London on 12 January 2009. Following completion, the project was shortlisted for the 2009 Prime Minister's Better Public Building Award.

The original  station was closed in mid-2008 for complete reconstruction. The two terminal tracks either side of a narrow island platform were replaced by a single track between two platforms, one for arriving passengers and the other for departing (Spanish solution). It reopened on 2 March 2009.

It was decided to include this in a plan for further grade separation to eliminate the conflict between services to Stratford and from Bank. A new timetable was introduced, with improved frequencies at peak hours. The new grade-separated route from Bank to Canary Wharf is used throughout the day, bypassing West India Quay station until mid-evening. Work on this project proceeded concurrently with the three-car upgrade work and the 'diveunder' (sometimes referred to as a flyunder but DLR have coined the term in this instance 'diveunder'), and the improved timetable came into use on 24 August 2009.

Upgrade to three-car trains (2007–2011)
With the development of the eastern Docklands as part of the Thames Gateway initiative and London's staging of the 2012 Summer Olympics, several extensions and enhancements were undertaken.

Capacity was increased by upgrading for trains with three cars, each with four doors per side. The alternative of more frequent trains was rejected as the signalling changes needed would have cost no less than upgrading to longer trains and with fewer benefits. The railway had been built for single-car operation, and the upgrade required both strengthening viaducts to take heavier trains and lengthening many platforms. The extra capacity was useful for the 2012 Summer Olympics, which increased the use of London's transport network. The main contractor for the expansion and alteration works was Taylor Woodrow.

Elverson Road, Royal Albert, Gallions Reach and Cutty Sark have not been extended for three-car trains; such extension may be impossible in some cases. Selective door operation is used, with emergency walkways in case a door fails to remain shut.  station is underground, and both costs and the risk to nearby historic buildings prevent platform extension. The tunnel has an emergency walkway. Additional work beyond that needed to take the three-car trains was also carried out at some stations. This included replacing canopies with more substantial ones along the full platform length.

For this upgrade DLR purchased an additional 31 cars compatible with existing rolling stock. The works were originally planned as three phases: Bank-Lewisham, Poplar-Stratford, and the Beckton branch. The original £200m contract was awarded on 3 May 2007. Work started in 2007 and Bank-Lewisham was originally due to be completed in 2009. However, the work programme for the first two phases was merged and the infrastructure work was completed by the end of January 2010. The Lewisham-Bank route now runs three-car trains exclusively. They started running on the Beckton branch on 9 May 2011. Stratford to Lewisham and Bank to Woolwich Arsenal services sometimes operate as three-car trains; other routes run the longer trains when required.

Extension to Stratford International (2011)

In addition to the three-car station extensions, partly funded from the 2012 Olympics budget, a line was opened from Canning Town to Stratford and Stratford International railway station along the former North London Line of the national railway system, with additional stations. It parallels the London Underground Jubilee line for much of its length.

The extension to Stratford International, taking over the North London Line from Canning Town to Stratford, links the Docklands area with domestic high-speed services on High Speed 1. It was an important part of transport improvements for the 2012 Olympic Games, much of which were held on a site adjoining Stratford International.

The first contract for construction work was awarded on 10 January 2007 and construction started in mid-2007. Originally scheduled to open in mid-2010, the line opened on 31 August 2011. On 11 November 2015 the Mayor of London announced that all stations on this line would be rezoned from zone 3 to zone 2/3.

Of these, Canning Town, West Ham and Stratford are former North London Line stations, and Stratford High Street was built on the site of  railway station.

From Canning Town to Stratford the extension runs parallel to the Jubilee line of the London Underground. As well as providing interchange with the adjacent Jubilee line stations, there are additional DLR stations at Star Lane, Abbey Road and Stratford High Street.

At Stratford new platforms were built for the North London Line at the northern end of the station. The old platforms (formerly 1 and 2) adjacent to the Jubilee line were rebuilt for the DLR, renumbered 16 (towards Stratford International) and 17 (towards Beckton/Woolwich Arsenal). Interchange between the Stratford International branch and DLR trains via Poplar is possible although the platforms are widely separated and at different levels. There is no physical connection between the two branches.

Relocation of Pudding Mill Lane station (2014)
One of the tunnel portals for Elizabeth line is on the original site of Pudding Mill Lane station. As a consequence, work was carried out to divert the DLR between City Mill River and the River Lea onto a new viaduct further south. This included a replacement station, which opened on 28 April 2014. The former station stood on the only significant section of single track on the system, between Bow Church and Stratford. The opportunity was taken to double the track in three stages, to improve capacity. There was originally no provision for works beyond the realigned section in the Crossrail Act.

Current system

Network
The DLR has  of tracks, with 45 stations.

The northern, southern and south-eastern branches terminate at the National Rail stations at Stratford, Stratford International, Lewisham and Woolwich Arsenal. Other interchanges with National Rail are at Limehouse, Greenwich and West Ham, while out-of-station interchanges for Oyster card holders are available between Shadwell DLR station and London Overground's station of the same name, and between Fenchurch Street and the DLR's western termini of Tower Gateway and Bank.

Between Limehouse and Tower Gateway, the DLR runs parallel to the London, Tilbury and Southend line.

Services
With four platforms and separated tracks at Canning Town and Poplar where the lines intersect, the network could theoretically support three discrete routes to maximise tph, although in practice the automated running of trains and turnaround capacities at each terminus supports the mix of routes available, with all sections of track bar part of the Bank-bound junction at West India Quay seeing regular use.

The following services are operated in normal off-peak service from 26 September 2022:

At peak times, these same services run, but with the frequency improved by 25% (6tph becomes 7.5tph, 12tph becomes 15tph). Additionally, in the morning peak, alternate Stratford - Canary Wharf services extend to/from Lewisham.

At terminal stations trains reverse direction in the platforms, except at Bank where there is a reversing headshunt in the tunnel beyond the station. There is also capability for an additional shuttle from Canning Town to Prince Regent when exhibitions are in progress at the ExCeL exhibition centre, although this is not supported by any additional turnback infrastructure. Trains serve every station on the route, but trains from Bank to Lewisham do not call at West India Quay because they are routed along the diveunder track to avoid junction conflicts. During long-term works for extension projects, other routes may be operated at weekends, such as Beckton to Lewisham if the Bank and Tower Gateway branch is closed.

Future services
The new rolling stock to be introduced from 2024 onwards will support service improvements, with peak Stratford International - Woolwich Arsenal services increasing to 15tph, peak Stratford - Canary Wharf services extended to Lewisham and a peak Stratford International - Beckton service.

Stations

Most stations are elevated, with others at street level, in cutting or underground. Access to the platforms is mostly by staircase and lift, with escalators at some stations. From the outset the system has been fully accessible to wheelchairs; much attention was paid to quick and effective accessibility for all passengers. The stations have high platforms matching the floor height of the cars, allowing level access for passengers with wheelchairs or pushchairs.

Most stations are of a modular design dating back to the initial system, extended and improved with two side platforms, each with separate access from the street, and platform canopies, although few examples remain of the original, distinctive rounded roof design. Canning Town, Custom House and Prince Regent are normally staffed on the platform whenever there is a significant exhibition at the ExCeL exhibition centre.

On 3 July 2007, DLR officially launched an art programme called DLR Art, similar to that on the London Underground, Art on the Underground. Alan Williams was appointed to produce the first temporary commission, called "Sidetrack", which portrays the ordinary and extraordinary sights, often unfamiliar to passengers, on the system and was displayed throughout the network.

Fares and ticketing

The system is part of the London fare zone system, and Travelcards that cover the appropriate zones are valid. There are one-day and season DLR-only "Rover" tickets, plus a one-day DLR "Rail and River Rover" ticket for the DLR and City Cruises river boats. Tickets can be purchased from ticket machines at the entrances to platforms, and are required before accessing the platform. Passengers using Oyster pay-as-you-go and contactless bank-cards need to touch both in and out of the system using card readers on automatic gates and platforms. There are no ticket barriers at DLR-only stations: correct ticketing is enforced by random on-train inspections by PSAs. Users of payment cards who have failed to touch in at the start of the journey, and other passengers without a correct ticket, may be liable to a £80 penalty fare or prosecution for fare evasion.

Rolling stock

The DLR is operated by 149 high-floor bi-directional single-articulated Electric Multiple Units (EMUs). Each car has four double doors on each side, and two or three cars make up a train. There are no cabs because normal operations are automated; a small driver's console is concealed behind a locked panel at each end, from which the PSA can drive the car. Consoles at each door opening allow the PSA to control door closure and make announcements whilst patrolling the train. With the absence of a driver's position, the fully glazed car ends provide a forward and rear view for passengers.

Despite having high floors and being automated, the cars are derived from a German light-rail design intended for street running. All cars look similar but there have been several different types, some still in service, others sold to other operators. Units were purchased from Bombardier in 2005 and delivered between 2007 and 2010.

Future rolling stock
In 2017, TfL opened bidding for new full-length, walk-through trains, subsequently awarded to CAF in 2019 and expected in service between 2024 and 2026, following delivery and testing on the network of the initial units from January 2023. Fifty-four 5-car trains were ordered, 33 to replace the existing stock and the rest to increase service capacity. The design of the train increases internal capacity by 10%, which combined with service improvements will bring about a 65% increase in capacity from Stratford to Lewisham, and a doubling of capacity between Canning Town and Beckton/Woolwich Arsenal. The trains will feature charging points and air-conditioning.

Depots
The network has two depots, at Poplar and Beckton. Poplar was opened with the initial line in 1987. Due to the constrained site, a new, larger, depot at Beckton was opened in 1994  and is now the main maintenance depot and primary control centre for the network. Track maintenance, off-peak train stabling, as well as the Operating and Maintenance Centre (OMC for TfL Staff) and the Hilton, Ritz and Dorchester Buildings houses the KeolisAmey Docklands franchise staff and the secondary back-up control centre are based at Poplar.

Signalling technology
Originally the DLR used signalling based on a fixed-block technology developed by GEC-General Signal and General Railway Signal. This was replaced in 1994 with a moving-block TBTC (Transmission Based Train Control) system developed by Alcatel, called SelTrac. The SelTrac system was bought by Thales in 2007 and updates are provided by Thales Rail Signalling Solutions. The same technology is used by rapid transit systems including Vancouver's SkyTrain, Toronto's SRT, the San Francisco Municipal Railway and Hong Kong's MTR. The SelTrac S40 system has also been adopted by the London Underground Jubilee line and Northern line. Transmissions occur via an inductive loop cable between each train's Vehicle On-Board Controller (VOBC) and the control centre (VCC, SMC) at Beckton. If this link is broken and communication is lost between the VOBC and VCC, SMC, the train stops until it is authorised to move again. Emergency brakes can be applied if the train breaks the speed limit during manual control or overshoots a fixed stopping point, or if it leaves the station when the route has not been set. A secondary control centre is based at Poplar, the location of the original control centre, which can operate immediately should there be any issues with the primary at Beckton.

Corporate affairs

Ownership and structure
Initially, DLR was a wholly owned subsidiary of London Regional Transport. In 1992, it was transferred to the London Docklands Development Corporation.

The infrastructure is owned by Docklands Light Railway Ltd, part of the London Rail division of Transport for London (TfL), which also manages London Overground, London Trams, London Cable Car and the Elizabeth line.

From 1997, DLR has been operated under franchise by the private sector. The first franchise was awarded to Serco Docklands Limited for seven years; operations began in April 1997. A management buyout backed by Serco management later sold its shares to Serco. A two-year extension was granted in 2002. In February 2005 TfL announced that Balfour Beatty/Keolis, First Carillion, RATP/Transdev and Serco had been shortlisted to operate the franchise, and in November 2005 TfL announced that Serco had retained the franchise for seven years from May 2006.

The Lewisham, City Airport and Woolwich Arsenal extensions were designed, financed, built and maintained by private companies (concessionnaires): City Greenwich Lewisham (CGL) Rail, City Airport Rail Enterprises (CARE), and Woolwich Arsenal Rail Enterprises (WARE). In 2011, Transport Trading Limited (a subsidiary of TfL) bought out the companies responsible for the City Airport and Woolwich Arsenal extensions, leaving only the Lewisham extension under private ownership until 31 March 2021.

In July 2012 TfL called for expressions of interest in bidding for the next DLR franchise, and in January 2013 Serco's contract was extended until September 2014.

In April 2013 TfL announced that Go-Ahead/Colas Rail, Keolis/Amey, Serco and Stagecoach had been shortlisted to bid for the next franchise. However, on 30 August, just before the bid submission date of 9 September 2013, Go-Ahead/Colas Rail pulled out. The franchise was awarded to KeolisAmey Docklands Limited, with a handover date of 7 December 2014, expiring in April 2021 with an option for extension without going to tender.

Performance
Within a year of launch, annual passenger numbers reached 17 million, increasing to 64 million in 2009, and more than 80 million in 2011. The most recent figures show 116.8 million annual passengers in the financial year to 31 March 2020. The first five years had unreliability and operational problems, but the system has since become highly reliable. Research in 2008 showed 87% of the population of North Woolwich were in favour of the DLR.

The Parliamentary Transport Select Committee favourably reviewed light rail in 2005, and due to the success of the DLR, proposals for similar systems elsewhere emerged. The North and West London Light Railway was a plan for an orbital railway serving the other side of London. The DLR has been successful, as have other recent light rail systems, although it was earlier criticised for having been designed with insufficient capacity to meet the demand that quickly arose.

Until 1 July 2013, the only bicycles that were allowed were folding ones. DLR stated that this is because if evacuation is required, they would slow down the process. DLR cars, especially older rolling stock, were not designed with bicycles in mind – if they were allowed, they might obstruct doors and emergency exits. Since January 2014 full-size bicycles have been allowed on DLR trains at off-peak hours and weekends (except Bank Station, where bicycles are not permitted for safety reasons).

Business trends
The key available trends in recent years for the Docklands Light Railway are (years ending 31 March):

Activities in the financial year 2020/21 were severely reduced by the impact of the coronavirus pandemic.

Future developments

Thamesmead extension

Mooted throughout the 2010s, an extension across the River Thames to Thamesmead was first proposed in November 2019 as part of the Thamesmead and Abbey Wood OAPF (Opportunity Area Planning Framework). Technical and feasibility work began in late 2020, following adoption of the OAPF. Stations would be located at Beckton Riverside and Thamesmead.

Thames Wharf station
A station was also initially proposed at Oriental Road; however this was discounted at an early stage and the site is now flanked by several developments. The potential of development on the land at Thames Wharf was on hold for until the late 2010s, as the area was being safeguarded for the route of the Silvertown Tunnel, a new Thames river crossing currently under construction on the site.

As part of the 2018 budget, the Chancellor announced funding for the DLR to support development in the Royal Docks. Following completion of the Silvertown Tunnel in the mid 2020s, around 5,000 homes will be built on the site, and a new DLR station constructed.

Tower Gateway station to Tower Hill interchange

In July 2014, a Transport Supporting Paper from the London Infrastructure Plan 2050 by the Mayor of London considered the closure of Tower Gateway DLR station and the branch serving it, with a replacement interchange being provided via new platforms at Tower Hill Underground station. This would increase train frequencies to Bank by approximately 30 per cent, thereby unlocking more capacity on the Bank branch.

Extensions cancelled or not progressed

Gallions Reach to Dagenham Dock 

The extension to Dagenham Dock in East London, via the Barking Riverside development was first proposed in 2003, and was anticipated that the project could be completed and open for use by 2017, at a cost of around £750m. In November 2008, the Mayor of London Boris Johnson announced that due to financial constraints the extension, along with a number of other transport projects, had been cancelled. The Barking Riverside development will now be served by an extension of the London Overground to a new station at Barking Riverside, costing around £260m.

Bank to Charing Cross
In February 2006 a proposal to extend the DLR to  station from  DLR branch was revealed. The idea originates from a DLR "Horizon Study".

These tunnels were intended to be incorporated into the abandoned Phase 2 of the Fleet Line (Phase 1 became the original Jubilee line, prior to the Jubilee line Extension). However they would need enlargement because DLR gauge is larger than tube gauge and current safety regulations would require an emergency walkway in the tunnel.

Two reasons driving the proposal are capacity problems at Bank, having just one interchange between the DLR and the central portion of Underground, and the difficult journeys faced by passengers from Kent and South Coast between their rail termini and the DLR. Intermediate stations would be at City Thameslink/Ludgate Circus and Aldwych, which was intended for future connection with the proposed but now abandoned Cross River Tram.

City Thameslink to Euston and St Pancras
The main benefit of such an extension would be to broaden the available direct transport links to the Canary Wharf site. It would create a new artery in central London and help relieve the Northern and Circle lines and provide another metro line to serve the High Speed line into Euston.

Lewisham to Catford and Beckenham Junction
This possible extension was considered during the latest Horizon Study. It has been seen as attractive to the district, as has the current terminus at Lewisham, built in an earlier extension. A map published in 2010 by Transport for London suggests that a further extension from Catford to  has also been considered.

However, early plans showed problems due to  station being only marginally lower than the busy A20 road, which impedes any extension. The plan is however being revised. When the Lewisham extension was first completed there were proposals to continue further to Beckenham to link it up with the Tramlink system. However, the way in which Lewisham station was built impedes this possible extension and it would prove costly to redevelop.

Lewisham to Bromley North
The scheme being considered by Transport for London and the London Borough of Bromley would convert the branch line to DLR operation. Although Lewisham Council planned to re-route the A20 road and redevelop the area south of Lewisham DLR station, the plans published in 2012 have no safeguarded route for an extension, making one unlikely.

Accidents and incidents 

 On 10 March 1987, before the system opened, a test train crashed through buffer stops at the original high-level  terminus and was left hanging from the end of the elevated track. The accident was caused by unauthorised tests being run before the correct installation of the wayside safety system had been verified; an omission in the wayside system allowed the train to travel too fast on the approach to the terminus. The train was being driven manually at the time.
 On 22 April 1991, two trains collided at a junction on the  bridge during morning rush hour, requiring a shutdown of the system and evacuation of passengers by ladder. One train was travelling automatically; the other was under manual control.
 On 9 February 1996, the Provisional IRA blew up a lorry under a bridge near , killing two people and injuring many others. This caused £85 million of damage and marked an end to an IRA ceasefire in force at the time. Significant disruption was caused and a train was stranded at Island Gardens, unable to move until the track was rebuilt.

In media
The DLR appears in the video to Sean Paul and Clean Bandit's single "Rockabye". Poplar, Canary Wharf and Heron Quays stations appear, interspersed with scenes of New York in winter, in the official video for the single "Trains and Winter Rains" by Enya, released in 2008. Shadwell station appears in the music video for the Martin Garrix song "We Are the People", the official song for UEFA Euro 2020.

Woolwich Arsenal plays an underground station in Athens in Jason Bourne.

The DLR also appears in the 2007 film 28 Weeks Later.

See also

 List of Docklands Light Railway stations
 List of tram and light rail transit systems
 Rail transport in Great Britain
 Transport in London (overview)
 Crossings of the River Thames
 Tunnels underneath the River Thames

Notes

References

Further reading

External links 

 

 
Airport rail links in London
Automated guideway transit
Keolis
Railway lines opened in 1987
Serco
Standard gauge railways in London
Transport in the Royal Borough of Greenwich
Transport in the London Borough of Lewisham
Transport in the London Borough of Newham
Transport in the London Borough of Tower Hamlets
Tunnels underneath the River Thames
Urban people mover systems
1987 establishments in England
Articles containing video clips
750 V DC railway electrification